Metanastria is a genus of moths in the family Lasiocampidae described by Jacob Hübner in 1820. The species of this genus are found in Europe, Japan, China, South Africa, throughout India, Sri Lanka, Myanmar, Java and Borneo.

Description
Palpi long and broad. Antennae with the branches gradually decreasing to the apex in the male, which is short throughout in female. Mid and hind tibia have minute terminal spur pairs. Forewings are broad, where vein 1c present, veins 6, 7, 8 or 6 and 7 only stalked. Stalk of veins 9 and 10 are long. Hindwings with veins 4 and 5 stalked or from cell. Vein 8 is almost touching vein 7. There are slight accessory costal veinlets.

Species
Metanastria aconyta Cramer, 1777
Metanastria albisparsa Wileman, 1910
Metanastria asteria
Metanastria capucina
Metanastria gemella De Lajonquière, 1979
Metanastria hyrtaca Cramer, 1782
Metanastria jani Zolotuhin, Treadaway & Witt, 1998
Metanastria lajonquierei
Metanastria marmorata Zolotuhin, Treadaway & Witt, 1998
Metanastria minor
Metanastria pika
Metanastria protracta Herrich-Schäffer, 1856
Metanastria subpurpurea Butler, 1881
Metanastria trefa Zolotuhin, Treadaway & Witt, 1998

References

Lasiocampidae